"Where Are We Going" is a song by Remy Shand, released on 17 May 2013 on Remy Records.
It is the first single released by the musician since 2002's single "Rocksteady".

References

External links
 http://open.spotify.com/album/0wSYqaQYbXjMrGyFGozXkB

2013 singles
Remy Shand songs
Song recordings produced by Remy Shand
Remy Records singles
2013 songs